The common Mexican tree frog (Smilisca baudinii) is a nocturnal species of tree frog whose native range extends from the Sonoran Desert and the Lower Rio Grande Valley of Texas south to Costa Rica. Common names include Mexican tree frog, Baudin's tree frog and Van Vliet's frog. They are usually found within lightly forested areas near permanent sources of water.

Description 

The common Mexican tree frog is generally brown-grey in color, with darker brown, irregular blotching. Its underside is typically a lighter grey or white. Its legs have distinctive dark banding.

Taxonomy 
The species has numerous synonymous classifications due to disjunct populations, and was mistakenly redescribed on several occasions by field researchers.

Conservation 
The common Mexican tree frog is considered to be a threatened species in the US state of Texas. It has only been reported in a few counties, and no estimates of its actual population count have been made.

References 

Amphibian Species of the World: Smilisca baudinii
Davidson College department of biology: Smilisca baudinii

External links

Smilisca
Frogs of North America
Amphibians of Mexico
Amphibians of the United States
Fauna of the Sonoran Desert
Fauna of the Rio Grande valleys
Amphibians described in 1841
Taxa named by André Marie Constant Duméril
Taxa named by Gabriel Bibron